The Order of Work Glory (also: Order of Work Merit, Romanian: Ordinul Gloria Muncii) is a Moldovan official order conferred for outstanding achievements in an individual's field of work, esteemed public activity during their career, and great contributions to the development of the Moldovan cultural, scientific, socio-economic, sporting and public spheres. The Order of Work Glory is awarded by the President of Moldova.

History
The Order of Work Glory was established by statutory law, and passed in the Moldovan Parliament in 1992. According to Article 17(9) of the Law regarding state distinctions of the Republic of Moldova (Law nr. 1123 din  30.07.1992), "the Order of Work Merit is awarded for outstanding work and great success in all fields."

Design
The exact specifications of the physical award can be found in the same law:

Recipients

Individual 

 Nicolae Timofti
 Igor Dodon (25 March 2008)
 Maia Sandu (23 July 2014)
Todur Zanet (2010)
Vladimir Plahotniuc (2007)
Gheorghe Ghidirim
Pavel Filip (2014)
Oleg Reidman

Collectives 

 Nicolae Testemițanu State University of Medicine and Pharmacy (October 6, 2005)
 Joint Stock Company "Apă-Canal Chişinău" (December 11, 2012) 
 Raisa Pakalo National College of Medicine and Pharmacy (June 5, 2014)
 Garment Factory "Ionel" (September 9, 2015)
 LUKOIL-Moldova (December 7, 2015)

References 

Politics of Moldova
 
Work Merit
1992 establishments in Moldova
Orders of merit
Awards established in 1992